Evanston is a city in Cook County, Illinois, situated on the North Shore along Lake Michigan. Evanston had a population of 78,110 .

Founded by Methodist business leaders in 1857, the city was incorporated in 1863. Evanston is home to Northwestern University, founded in 1851 before the city's incorporation, one of the world's leading research universities. Today known for its socially liberal politics and ethnically diverse population, Evanston was historically a dry city, until 1972. The city uses a council–manager system of government and is a Democratic stronghold. The city is heavily shaped by the influence of Chicago, externally, and Northwestern, internally. The city and the university share a historically complex long-standing relationship.

History

Prior to the 1830s, the area now occupied by Evanston was mainly uninhabited, consisting largely of wetlands and swampy forest. However, Potawatomi Native Americans used trails along higher lying ridges that ran in a general north–south direction through the area, and had at least some semi-permanent settlements along the trails.

After the first non-Native Americans settled in the area in 1836, the names "Grosse Point Territory" and "Gross Point voting district" were used through the 1830s and 1840s, although the territory had no defined boundaries. The area remained only sparsely settled, supporting some farming and lumber activity on some of the higher ground, as well as a number of taverns or "hotels" along the ridge roads. Grosse Pointe itself steadily eroded into the lake during this period.

In 1850, a township called Ridgeville was organized, extending from Graceland Cemetery in Chicago to the southern edge of the Ouilmette Reservation, along what is now Central Street, and from Lake Michigan to Western Avenue in Chicago. The 1850 census shows a few hundred settlers in this township, and a post office with the name of Ridgeville was established at one of the taverns. However, no municipality yet existed.

In 1851, a group of Methodist business leaders founded Northwestern University and Garrett Biblical Institute.  Unable to find available land on the north shore up to Lake Forest, the committee was ready to purchase farmland to the west of the city when Orrington Lunt insisted on one final visit to the present location. They chose a bluffed and wooded site along the lake as Northwestern's home, purchasing several hundred acres of land from Dr. John Foster, a Chicago farm owner. In 1854, the founders of Northwestern submitted to the county judge their plans for a city to be named Evanston after John Evans, one of their leaders. In 1857, the request was granted. The township of Evanston was split off from Ridgeville Township; at approximately the same time, that portion of Ridgeville south of Devon Avenue was organized as Lake View Township.

Evanston was formally incorporated as a town on December 29, 1863, but declined in 1869 to become a city despite the Illinois legislature passing a bill for that purpose. Evanston expanded after the Civil War with the annexation of the village of North Evanston. Finally, in early 1892, following the annexation of the village of South Evanston, voters elected to organize as a city. The 1892 boundaries are largely those that exist today.

In the late summer of 1912, the beaches in Evanston were infested with thousands of rats. The rats had burrowed into the sides of the lake banks, dug holes in the sand, and hid under piers. Most of the rats were extremely large and savage, attacking people who disturbed them. Local bathers struggled to navigate the shores, constantly stepping into the hidden rat holes. John Morgan, the manager of an extermination company tasked with removing the vermin, stated that it was not uncommon for rats to live around the lake's shore because of the quantity of dead fish that was cast to shore by the waves. The weather also played a role since the close proximity to the beaches allowed the rats to swim out in the water during the hot summer.

During the 1960s, Northwestern University changed the city's shoreline by adding a  lakefill.

In 1939, Evanston hosted the first NCAA basketball championship final at Northwestern University's Patten Gymnasium.

In August 1954, Evanston hosted the second assembly of the World Council of Churches, still the only WCC assembly to have been held in the United States. President Dwight Eisenhower welcomed the delegates, and Dag Hammarskjöld, secretary-general of the United Nations, delivered an important address entitled "An instrument of faith".

Evanston first received power in April 1893.  Many people lined the streets on Emerson St. where the first appearance of street lights were lined and turned on. Today, the city is home to Northwestern University, Music Institute of Chicago, and other educational institutions, as well as headquarters of Alpha Phi International women's fraternity, Rotary International, the National Merit Scholarship Corporation, the National Lekotek Center, the Sigma Alpha Epsilon fraternity, the Sigma Chi fraternity and the Woman's Christian Temperance Union.

Evanston is the birthplace of Tinkertoys, and is the one of the locations claiming to have originated the ice cream sundae. Evanston was the home of the Clayton Mark and Company, which for many years supplied the most jobs.

Evanston was a dry community from 1858 until 1972, when the City Council voted to allow restaurants and hotels to serve liquor on their premises. In 1984, the Council voted to allow retail liquor outlets within the city limits.

In March 2021, Evanston became the first city in the United States to pay reparations to African American residents (or their descendants) who were considered subjects of alleged unfair housing practices. The city council of the city voted 8 to 1 to approve the reparations which consisted of a $25,000 payment to African American households that can be used as down payments on their homes, house payments or for home repairs. This was the initial payment, with plans to distribute 10 million dollars in reparations payments to black residents over the next 10 years.

In August 2021, Evanston became one of the first cities to approve a pilot project providing a guaranteed income to select residents, drawing upon a combination of public funds and a partnership with Northwestern University.

Geography

Demographics

2020 Census

Note: the US Census treats Hispanic/Latino as an ethnic category. This table excludes Latinos from the racial categories and assigns them to a separate category. Hispanics/Latinos can be of any race.

As of the 2020 census there were 78,110 people, 27,918 households, and 15,184 families residing in the city. The racial makeup of the city was 59.06% White, 16.06% African American, 9.92% Asian, 0.67% Native American, 0.06% Pacific Islander, 4.46% from other races, and 9.78% from two or more races. Hispanic or Latino of any race were 11.24% of the population.

There were 27,918 households, out of which 47.27% had children under the age of 18 living with them, 42.44% were married couples living together, 8.71% had a female householder with no husband present, and 45.61% were non-families. 34.79% of all households were made up of individuals, and 13.46% had someone living alone who was 65 years of age or older. The average household size was 3.22 and the average family size was 2.40.

The city's age distribution consisted of 19.9% under the age of 18, 16.0% from 18 to 24, 25% from 25 to 44, 23.1% from 45 to 64, and 16.0% who were 65 years of age or older. The median age was 36.2 years. For every 100 females, there were 91.5 males. For every 100 females age 18 and over, there were 87.3 males.

The median income for a household in the city was $82,335, and the median income for a family was $130,494. Males had a median income of $56,582 versus $42,589 for females. The per capita income for the city was $53,685. About 4.6% of families and 11.7% of the population were below the poverty line, including 7.5% of those under age 18 and 6.6% of those age 65 or over.

12.3% of Evanston's 9,259 businesses were black-owned in 2012.

Government and politics
The City of Evanston became sister cities with the Dnieprovsky District of the City of Kyiv, Ukraine in 1988, and sister cities with Belize City, Belize in 1992.

Evanston has a council-manager system of government and is divided into nine wards, each of which is represented by an Alderman, or member of the Evanston City Council.

Evanston was heavily Republican in voter identification from the time of the Civil War up to the 1960s. Richard Nixon carried it in the 1968 presidential election. The city began trending Democratic in the 1960s, though it never elected a Democratic mayor until 1993.

Mayors

Recent election results
In the 2012 presidential election, Democratic incumbent Barack Obama won 85% of Evanston's vote, compared to 13% for Republican challenger Mitt Romney. In the 2016 Democratic primary, Hillary Clinton received 54% of the votes of Evanston Democrats to Bernie Sanders' 45%. During that year's general election, Clinton won 87% of the vote in Evanston, while Republican Donald Trump received just 7%. Evanston's turnout for presidential elections has grown steadily since 2004, with 80% of registered voters voting in the 2016 general election.

In the 2020 presidential election Democrat Joe Biden received 90% of the vote while Republican Donald Trump received only 7%.

Nicknames
 Early after its founding, because of its strong Methodist influence, and its attempt to impose moral rigor, Evanston was called "Heavenston".
In the early 20th century Evanston was called "The City of Churches".
 The varied works of numerous prominent architects, and many prominent mansions, especially near the lakefront, gave the town by the 1920s the sobriquet "The City of Homes", a fact often touted by local real estate agents. Use of the phrase has been attributed to a 1924 speech at the local Kiwanis club.
 Since the late 20th century, because of Evanston's activism and often left-of-center politics, it is sometimes humorously (or sarcastically) referred to as "The People's Republic of Evanston".
 The eastern border of the adjacent village of Skokie that falls within Evanston township schools and 60203 ZIP Code is called "Skevanston", a portmanteau of both names.

Education

Public schools

High school

Most of Evanston (and a small part of the village of Skokie) is within the boundaries of Evanston Township High School District 202. The school district has a single high school, Evanston Township High School, with an enrollment of just over 4,000, covering grades 9 through 12.

Primary schools
Evanston-Skokie Community Consolidated School District 65, covering all of Evanston and a small part of Skokie, provides primary education from pre-kindergarten through grade 8. The district has ten elementary schools (kindergarten through fifth grade), three middle schools (grades 6 through 8), two magnet schools (K through 8), two special schools or centers, and an early childhood school. Dr. Devon Horton is the Superintendent of Schools.

Private schools
Private schools located in Evanston, Illinois include:

Beacon Academy, a Montessori high school
Chiaravalle Montessori School, a Montessori school for children ages 2–14
Midwest Montessori School
Pope John XXIII School, a Catholic school serving children pre-kindergarten through eighth grade.  The school dates back to 1886 with the establishment of separate schools serving St. Nicholas and St. Mary's parishes in Evanston. The original St. Nicholas School was in the building now called the Annex. The main school building was built in 1954. In 1986 the two parish schools consolidated and the new school was renamed Pope John XXIII School.
Roycemore School
St. Athanasius School, a Catholic school for children from junior kindergarten through eighth grade. "St. A's" is a popular shortened nickname for the school and it is part of the St. Athanasius parish in Northwest Evanston. The mascot is RedHawks. The school focuses on three key themes; Love, Learn, Lead.

Library

The Evanston Public Library was established in 1873, and has a satellite branch at the Robert Crown Community Center. Karen Danczak Lyons is the Library Director. The North Branch of the Evanston Library was closed in 2021.

Tertiary
In 2006, National-Louis University closed its former main site, which had  of land, with about 33% in Evanston; the majority of the land was in Wilmette.

Universities
Founded in 1855, Evanston is home to Northwestern University. Located along Lake Michigan, Northwestern's campus spans 240 acres with an estimated 250 buildings. Since 1908, Kellogg School of Management as well as Garrett-Evangelical Theological Seminary (1853) have institutions, of which both share the campus with Northwestern.

Transportation

Evanston's growth occurred largely because of its accessibility from Chicago by rail. The Northwestern founders did not finalize their commitment to siting the university there until they were assured the Chicago & Milwaukee Railway line would run there. C&M trains began stopping in Evanston in 1855. Evanston later experienced rapid growth as one of the first streetcar suburbs. The North Shore Line, the interurban railroad that gave the area its nickname, ran through Evanston and continued to Waukegan and Milwaukee.

The city is still connected to Chicago by rail transit. The CTA's Purple Line, part of the Chicago 'L' system, runs through Evanston. From its terminal at Howard in Chicago, the line heads north to the South Boulevard, Main, Dempster, Davis, Foster, Noyes, and Central stations, before terminating at the Linden station in Wilmette, Illinois. Metra's Union Pacific/North Line also serves Evanston, with stations at Main Street, Davis Street and Central Street, the first two being adjacent to Purple Line stations. The CTA's Yellow Line also runs through the city, though it does not stop there. Evanston is served by six CTA bus routes as well as four Pace bus routes.

Automobile routes from Chicago to Evanston include Lake Shore Drive, the Edens Expressway (I-94), and McCormick Boulevard, although the first two of those do not extend to Evanston itself and require driving through Rogers Park (via Sheridan Road or Ridge Avenue) and Skokie, respectively. The main routes from the north are the Edens, Green Bay Road, and Sheridan Road. Active modes of transportation include miles of sidewalks and bicycle lanes.

Economy
Companies based in Evanston include ZS Associates.

Top employers

As of 2015, according to the State of Illinois Dept Commerce and Economic Opportunity and Individual Employers, the top employers in the city are:

Commercial districts
Once the home of one of the first Marshall Field's and Sears stores in suburbia, Evanston has several shopping areas:
 Downtown - centered around the Davis Street Metra and "L" stops, Evanston's downtown adjoins Northwestern University. There are over 300 businesses, several high-rise office and residential buildings, three traditional low-rise shopping areas and over 85 restaurants. It is roughly bordered by Emerson Street to the north, Dempster Street to the south, Ridge Avenue to the west, and the Lake to the east.
 Central Street - actually several shopping districts linked along the northernmost of the city's principal east–west arteries, with the most active clustered around the Central Street Metra station and characterized by specialty shops and restaurants.
 Dempster Street - just off the Dempster "L" stop; over 60 shops.
 Main Street  - approximately 3 blocks of mostly independent boutiques and restaurants abutting both a CTA and Metra stop. The neighborhood is also home to the Evanston Arts Depot.
 Howard Street - Howard Street forms the southern border between Evanston and the City of Chicago. The Howard Street CTA station is a transfer point between the Red, Purple, and Yellow line trains as well as several CTA and PACE bus routes.
 Chicago Avenue - not a separate shopping district per se, this extension of what is called Clark Street in Chicago runs parallel to the rail lines and is the principal north–south artery in Evanston from Howard Street north to its terminus at Northwestern University. Chicago Avenue connects the Main Street, Dempster Street, and Downtown shopping districts.
 Noyes - Bordering the Noyes "L" stop with around a dozen restaurants, dry-cleaners and convenience stores.

Finance
 Magnetar Capital, a hedge fund based in Evanston, was ranked #4 among hedge funds worldwide by Institutional Investor/Alpha magazine in 2015.

Health care
Two hospitals are located within Evanston's city limits:

Evanston Hospital, part of NorthShore University HealthSystem
Ascension Saint Francis Hospital Evanston, part of Ascension

University-city relations

A perennial debate in Evanston is the issue of Northwestern University's status as a tax-exempt institution. In the founding charter of Northwestern University, signed in 1851, the state granted the school an exemption from paying property taxes, and unlike other well-off private universities with statutory exemptions, it provides its own police services, but not firefighter/paramedic services. It pays water, sewer, communications, real property transfer taxes, and building permit fees, but not property taxes. Northwestern does not make Payments in Lieu of Taxes for the real estate it removes from property tax rolls.

Its backers, like former Evanston mayor and Northwestern alumna Lorraine H. Morton, contend that the benefits of having an elite research institution justify Northwestern's tax status. These supporters highlight the fact that Northwestern University is the largest employer in Evanston, and that its students and faculty constitute a large consumer base for Evanston businesses. This controversy was revived in 2003 when the university purchased an eight-story office building downtown, removing it from the tax rolls. An advisory referendum put on the April elections ballot, dubbed by supporters as a "Fair Share Initiative", received a majority, but was not passed into ordinance by the City Council.

During the tenure of Elizabeth Tisdahl as mayor, relationships between the university and Evanston improved. Upon arriving at Northwestern in 2009 president Morton O. Schapiro forged a strong working relationship with Tisdahl; in 2015, two announced that Northwestern would begin to donate $1 million annually to benefit city services and programs.

Notable people

Local media
 The Daily Northwestern, the student newspaper at Northwestern University
 The Evanston Review, subscription weekly newspaper, part of Pioneer Press
 The Evanston Roundtable, a free online news site
 The Evanston Sentinel, a free weekly African-American newspaper
 Evanston Now, an online newspaper and community website

Use as film location
Evanston's variety of housing and commercial districts, combined with easy access to Chicago, make it a popular filming location. Evanston as of December 2008 is listed as a filming location for 65 different films, notably those of John Hughes. Much of the 1984 film Sixteen Candles was filmed in and around Evanston, the 1988 movie She's Having a Baby, as was the 1989 film Uncle Buck, the 1993 film Dennis the Menace, and the 1997 film Home Alone 3. A number of scenes from the 1986 Garry Marshall film Nothing in Common were filmed on the Northwestern University campus and Evanston's lakeshore. Although not filmed there, the 2004 film Mean Girls is set in the Chicago suburbs, and makes several references to the area. The movie's screenwriter and co-star, Tina Fey, had worked at the Evanston YMCA when starting her comedy career.  In the 2003 film Cheaper by the Dozen, the family moves to Evanston. Additionally, the baseball movie Rookie of the Year, featuring Gary Busey and Thomas Ian Nicholas, was partially shot at Haven Middle School.  The 2015 ABC Family reality series Becoming Us was filmed in Evanston.

In The Princess Bride, according to IMDb, the screenplay says that the boy and his grandfather live in Evanston.  This was also stated by Mandy Patinkin in a behind-the-scenes interview.  The story's author, William Goldman, was born in Chicago and grew up in Highland Park a little more than ten miles north of Evanston.

Sustainability
Evanston has gained recognition and reputation for efforts related to sustainability, including those by government, citizens, and institutions. In 2015, the city was named the World Wildlife Fund's Earth Hour Capital after competing against cities including Seattle and Cleveland. In 2016, Evanston was again a finalist in the competition.

Climate Action Plan
In October 2006, the city voted to sign the United States Conference of Mayors Climate Protection Agreement, and a number of citizen task forces convened to develop a plan to reduce the city's carbon footprint. The Evanston Climate Action Plan ("ECAP"), accepted by the City Council in November 2008, suggested over 200 strategies to make Evanston more sustainable, principally by reducing carbon emissions associated with transportation, buildings, energy sources, waste, and food production. In June 2011, the United States Conference of Mayors awarded Evanston first place in the small city category of the Mayors' Climate Protection Awards, based largely on the city's use of the ECAP, which the city asserts has reduced emissions by 24,000 metric tons per year. On September 15, 2011, Wal-Mart presented Mayor Tisdahl with a $15,000 award in recognition of the honor, which the mayor donated to Citizens' Greener Evanston.

Points of interest
Frances Willard House
Free School of Evanston
Grosse Point Lighthouse
Ladd Arboretum
Mount Trashmore
Northwestern University

See also

 National Register of Historic Places listings in Evanston, Illinois

References

Further reading
 
 Barr, Mary (2014). Friends Disappear: The Battle for Racial Equality in Evanston.

External links

 

 
1857 establishments in Illinois
Chicago metropolitan area
Cities in Cook County, Illinois
Cities in Illinois
Populated places established in 1857
Illinois populated places on Lake Michigan
Streetcar suburbs